Katherine McLoughlin became Katherine Norton aka Katherine nic Lochlainn (before 1650 – after 1679) was an Irish Quaker preacher in the 1670s.

Life
McLoughlin appeared in Barbados to marry a Mr Norton when she was sixteen. She had been born near Coleraine to well-off parents and it has been surmised that two of her relations (or even brothers) may have been preachers. She had been educated in Derry where she had learned to speak the Irish language.

Her life changed when she met George Fox in 1671. He had arrived in Barbados to find Quaker coverts and to establish a following. McLoughlin was a convert and although Quaker women were subject to men's authority they were allowed to preach. McLoughlin became a talented and convincing preacher.

Sharp was a successful wool merchant and Quaker in Dublin. He supported William Penn and the establishment of the movement in America. In 1676 she was a guest of Sharp's with about twenty others. Some of these were bound for America, but McLoughlin was bound for the northern counties. She wrote to Sharp in 1678 noting her welcome and the "innocent" people she was meeting. Sharp had already noted her success in creating converts including the wife of a judge.

The advancement of the Quaker movement was constrained by the language barrier, but she knew the Irish language (aka Gaelic) and preached in that language. There were few Quakers but they made an impact. She attracted attention just because she was a woman performing a public role. She had disputes but she preached in the Irish counties of Armagh, Cavan, Westmeath and Dublin. She left Ireland in 1677 en route for England, but no record has been found of her life after that. She was noted as a successful preacher during a period of significant growth of the Quaker movement in Ireland.

References

17th-century births
Quakers in the Caribbean
Irish religious leaders